The Junkers F 13 was the world's first all-metal transport aircraft, developed in Germany at the end of World War I. It was an advanced cantilever-wing monoplane, with enclosed accommodation for four passengers. 322 planes of the type were manufactured, an exceptionally large number for a commercial airliner of the era, and were operated all over the globe. It was in production for thirteen years and in commercial service for more than thirty.

Design and development

The F 13 was a very advanced aircraft when built, an aerodynamically clean all-metal low-wing cantilever (without external bracing) monoplane. Even later in the 1920s, it and other Junkers types were unusual as unbraced monoplanes in a biplane age, with only Fokker's designs of comparable modernity. It was the world's first all-metal passenger aircraft and Junkers' first commercial aircraft.

The designation letter F stood for Flugzeug, aircraft; it was the first Junkers aeroplane to use this system. Earlier Junkers notation labelled it J 13. Russian-built aircraft used the designation Ju 13.

Like all Junkers duralumin-structured designs, from the 1918 J 7 to the 1932 Ju 46, (some 35 models), it used an aluminium alloy (duralumin) structure entirely covered with Junkers' characteristic corrugated and stressed duralumin skin. Internally, the wing was built up on nine circular cross-section duralumin spars with transverse bracing. All control surfaces were horn balanced.

Behind the single engine was a semi-enclosed cockpit for the crew, roofed but without side glazing. There was an enclosed and heated cabin for four passengers with windows and doors in the fuselage sides. Passenger seats were fitted with seat belts, unusual for the time. The F 13 used a fixed conventional split landing gear with a rear skid, though some variants landed on floats or on skis.

The F 13 first flew on 25 June 1919, powered by a 127 kW (170 hp) Mercedes D IIIa inline upright water-cooled engine. The first production machines had a wing of greater span and area and had the more powerful 140 kW (185 hp) BMW IIIa upright inline water-cooled motor.

Many variants were built using Mercedes, BMW, Junkers, and Armstrong Siddeley Puma liquid-cooled inline engines, and Gnome-Rhône Jupiter and Pratt & Whitney Hornet air-cooled radial engines. The variants were mostly distinguished by a two letter code, the first letter signifying the airframe and the second the engine. Junkers L5-engined variants all had the second letter -e, so type -fe was the long fuselage -f airframe with a L5 engine.

Operational history

Any manufacturer of civil aircraft immediately after World War I was faced with competition from the very large numbers of surplus warplanes that might be cheaply converted – for example, the DH.9C. German manufacturers had further problems with the restrictions imposed by the Inter-Allied Aeronautical Commission of Control, which banned the production of warplanes and of any aircraft in the period of 1921–2. Junkers picked up orders abroad in 1919 in Austria, Poland and the USA and, in the following years with SCADTA (Colombia) and the United States Post Office Department. John Larsen Aircraft in the USA purchased a production licence, their machines being designated JL-6. In 1922 there were sales in England, France Italy and Japan.

In Bolivia, LAB's first airplane was a Junkers F-13; first flight took off from Cochabamba on September 23, 1925.

Junkers set up its own airline – Junkers Luftverkehr AG in 1921 – to encourage the acquisition of the F 13 by German airlines which was flying 60 of them by 1923. They also established a branch of this airline in Iran. Other marketing techniques were used, providing F 13s on cheap leases and free loans, with such effect that some 16 operators across Europe were flying them. When Junkers Luftverkehr merged into Luft Hansa in 1926, 9.5 million miles had been flown by them. Luft Hansa itself bought 55 aircraft and in 1928 were using them on 43 domestic routes. Even in 1937, their F 13s were flying over 50 flights per week on four routes. They were finally withdrawn in 1938.

Most of the F 13s produced before completion of the marque in 1932 were built at Junkers German base at Dessau. During the difficult 1921–3 period production was transferred to Junkers plants at Danzig and Reval. In 1922–3, Hugo Junkers signed a contract with the Soviet Union to produce the aircraft in a Soviet factory at Fili near Moscow which became known as "Plant no. 22". Some of these aircraft served Soviet airlines and some the Red Army.

There were some other military users. The Colombian Air Force used the F 13 (and the related W.33, W.34 and K.43) as bombers in the Colombia–Peru War in 1932–3. The Republic of China flew F 13s converted into scout bombers until the January 28 Incident in 1932, when they were destroyed by the Japanese along with the Shanghai Aircraft Factory. The Turkish Flying Forces flew a few.

A feature that made the F 13 popular internationally was the ease with which its landing gear could be converted to floats. During the formative years of commercial aviation, bodies of water such as rivers, lakes, seas and oceans were more abundant than landing strips and civil airports in many parts of the world, so seaplanes were commonplace and even, in some places, more useful than regular aircraft. Aside from the obvious addition of floats, little modification was needed for this conversion; however, the different configuration could cause issues with directional control, and so some models had their rudder extended to compensate for this.

From their introduction in 1919, commercial F 13s were in service for more than thirty years; the last commercial F 13 was retired in Brazil in 1951.

Back in Production 2009-2019

A German-Swiss project to build a reconstruction of the F 13 was launched in 2009; the first flight was in September 2016. The reconstruction is equipped with radio and a transponder, and uses a 1930s Pratt & Whitney R-985 Wasp Junior engine, but is otherwise as close as possible to the original. Additional reconstructions are to be sold for $2.5 million apiece.

Junkers Flugzeugwerke (SD303) has resurrected the Junkers F 13 as an all-new airplane to honor Hugo Junkers’ achievements. The company completed the aircraft in 2016 and it is at EBACE commemorating the type's maiden flight 100 years ago. The model is available for purchase, and three others like it are currently under construction. Work was in progress on the second and third aircraft during 2019, with airframe number two's maiden flight planned for early that summer.

Variants
F 13 first prototype, smaller wings (span 14.47 m/47 ft 5.75 in, area 38.9 m² /419 ft²) and less powerful engine 127 kW (170 hp) Mercedes D IIIa inline) than production models.
F 13a first production aircraft with 140 kW (185 hp) BMW IIIa engine.
F 13ba, ca, da, fa all with the 149 kW (200 hp) Junkers L2 upright inline water-cooled engine and a series of structural modifications. The fa variant was about 1 m (3 ft) longer.
F 13be, ce, de, fe as the above but all with 230 kW (310 hp) Junkers L5 upright inline water-cooled engines.
F 13dle, fle, ge, he, ke variants with the Junkers L5 above.
F 13bi, ci, di, fi, as ca to fa but all with the 186 kW (250 hp) BMW IV engine.
F 13co, fo, ko with the 230 kW (310 hp) BMW Va engine.
Junkers-Larsen JL-6American version of the F 13 built by Junkers-Larsen. Eight built.
Junkers-Larsen JL-12Ground-attack derivative of the Junkers-Larsen JL-6, with 300 kW (400 hp) Liberty L-12 engine, armored, and armed with a downward-pointing battery of 30 Thompson submachine guns.
Rimowa Junkers F 13
Modern replica first flown 15 September 2016. With the approval of the Junkers heirs, Rimowa Junkers was renamed Junkers Flugzeugwerke AG, and moved to Altenrhein. Their models have modern features, like more and better instruments, while the outward appearance is the one of a Junkers-Larsen JL-6.

Operators

Afghan Air Force acquired four aircraft from 1924 through 1928.

Argentine Air Force - three aircraft

Austrian Air Force (1927-1938)
Österreichische Luftverkehrs AG (ÖLAG) started flying with F 13 and operated 24 aircraft0

SNETA

Lloyd Aéreo Boliviano received the first F 13 as a gift from the German community on the occasion of the centennial of Bolivian independence.

Syndicato Condor - Serviços Aéreos Condor
Varig

Bulgarian Air Force
Bunavad operated two aircraft between 1927 and 1928.

Chilean Air Force

Avianca as SCADTA
Colombian Air Force
 Free City of Danzig
Danziger Luftpost
Lloyd Ostflug

Aeronaut operated F 13 between 1922 and 1927.

Aero Airways
Kauhajoki Flying Club
Finnish Air Force
Finnish Border Guard

Junkers Luftverkehr, primary user until merger with Deutscher Aero Lloyd into Deutsche Luft Hansa
Deutsche Luft Hansa operated about 110 aircraft, a large part taken over from Junkers Luftverkehr

Aero R.T. operated six aircraft between 1923 and 1927.
Aeroexpress Rt. (1923−1930)
Royal Hungarian Air Force

Air Iceland operated three aircraft between 1928 and 1931.

Imperial Iranian Air Force

Latvijas Gaisa Satiksmes Akciju Sabiedriba - national airline, operated three aircraft in 1922-1925.

Lithuanian Air Force for a short period operated single aircraft, which crash-landed in Lithuania after illegally passing its border in 1919.

 Mexican Air Force

Mongolian People's Army Air Force operated three aircraft between 1925 and 1931.

Aero-Targ leased six aircraft from Danziger Luftpost in 1921.
Aerolloyd (later renamed Aerolot) operated 16 aircraft between 1922 and 1929.
LOT Polish Airlines took over 15 remaining aircraft from Aerolot and operated them between 1929 and 1936.

Serviços Aéreos Portugueses operated one aircraft between 1929 and 1931.

Royal Romanian Air Force

Deruluft
Aviaarktika operated several aircraft.
Soviet Air Force

South African Airways operated four aircraft obtained from Union Airways.
South African Air Force

Union Aérea Española UAE
Fuerzas Aéreas
Cruz Roja Española

Swedish Air Force
Aktiebolaget Aerotransport

Ad Astra Aero operated at least four F 13s (registered CH-91/92/93/94) between 1919 and probably 1930.

Turkish Air Force operated three aircraft between 1925 and 1933.
Turkish Air Post operated two ex-military aircraft between 1933 and 1938.
General Command of Mapping (Turkey) operated one ex-air force aircraft (serial no: 882) equipped with aerial photo system from 1933 to 1938.

Civil register lists five F 13s during the 1930s

United States Post Office Department
United States Navy

Accidents and incidents
 On 1 September 1920, a Junkers-Larsen JL-6 caught fire and crashed in Morristown, NJ. Max Miller, the United States Air Mail Service's first pilot was at the controls and, along with his mechanic/crewman, Gustav Reierson, perished. They managed to eject all nine mail bags before the plane hit the ground.
 On 8 June 1924, a SCADTA F 13, registration A13, stalled and crashed into a tree on takeoff from Barranquilla, Colombia, killing all five on board.
 On 10 March 1926, a Latvijas Gaisa Satiksmes F 13, c/n 579, registration No. B-LATA, operating for Aero O/Y, crashed on approach to Helsinki. No fatalities were registered.
 On 22 March 1925, a Zakavia F 13, registration R-RECA, crashed on takeoff from Tiflis, Georgia, killing all five on board. This crash is particularly famous because three high ranking Soviet officials died in the crash. Solomon Mogilevsky, Alexander Myasnikov, and Georgi Aterbekov who were flying to meet Trotsky who was in convalescence in Sukhum.
 On 24 July 1926, a Deutsche Luft Hansa F 13, registration D-272, crashed at Juist, Germany due to weather, killing all four on board.
 On 3 September 1926, a SCADTA F 13, registration A-10, collided with cloud-obscured terrain between Honda and La Victoria, Colombia. The two crew and two passengers were injured, and the aircraft was a total loss.
 On 27 July 1927, a Deutsche Luft Hansa F 13, registration D-206, crashed at Amöneburg, Germany after attempting an emergency landing due to engine failure, killing all five on board.
 On 26 May 1928 at 08:15, a Deutsche Lufthansa Junkers F 13, registration D-583, crashed at Hahnenberg, Radevormwald, Germany due to pilot error, killing three of five on board.
 On 21 July 1930, a Croydon-based Walcot Air Line F 13, registration G-AAZK, crashed at Meopham, near Gravesend, Kent, due to structural failure, killing all six on board including its second pilot, Lt Col George L P Henderson, a pilot with considerable skill and war-time experience.
 On 12 July 1932, Czech industrialist Tomáš Baťa died, together with pilot Jindrich Broucek, when his Junkers J13, registration D-1608 crashed after taking off in heavy fog.
 On 2 November 1932 a Deutsche Luft Hansa F 13, registration D-724, crashed at Echterpfuhl, Germany due to wing separation, killing all five on board.
 On 9 October 1935, an Aero O/Y F 13, registration OH-ALI, crashed into the Gulf of Finland in fog, killing all six on board.

Survivors

Aircraft on display
Reserve collection Musée de l'Air et de l'Espace, Le Bourget, Paris, France
Deutsches Museum Munich, Germany
 Transport Museum of Budapest, Hungary
SE-AAC, ex-D-343, Tekniska museet, Stockholm, Sweden
Tomas Bata Memorial, Zlín, Czech Republic

In storage or under restoration
Deutsches Technikmuseum Berlin, Germany

Specifications (F 13)

See also

Related developments
Junkers W 33
Junkers W 34
Junkers K 43
Junkers Ju 46

References

Notes

Bibliography
 Andersson, Lennart. "Chinese 'Junks': Junkers Aircraft Exports to China 1925-1940". Air Enthusiast, No. 55, Autumn 1994, pp. 2–7. 

 Andersson, Lennart. "Talkback". Air Enthusiast, No. 18, April – July 1982. p. 80. .

 Dulaitis, David D. "Talkback". Air Enthusiast, No. 18, April – July 1982. pp. 79–80. .

 Gerdessen, F. "Estonian Air Power 1918 – 1945". Air Enthusiast, No. 18, April – July 1982. pp. 61–76. .

 Guest, Carl-Fredrick. "Talkback". Air Enthusiast, No. 18, April – July 1982. pp. 78–79. .

Further reading 
Waernberg: Junkers F-13 det forsta trafikflygplanet i Sverige (Karlskrona 1992) 
Vagvolgyi: Junkers F-13 : a Junkers repulogepek tortenete 1909-tol 1932-ig"
Stroud: Wings of Peace: The Junkers F13 (Aeroplane Monthly)
Pohlmann: Prof. Junkers nannte es "Die Fliege"
Wagner: Junkers F13 und ihre Vorlaeufer
Endres: The Junkers F13 in Poland (Air Pictorial)

External links

 Junkers F13 on the Hugo Junkers Homepage.
 Junkers F 13 photos from the Budapest Aviation Museum

1910s German airliners
F 13
Aircraft first flown in 1919